Andrea Doria (C 553) was an  helicopter cruiser of the Marina Militare. Built by the Cantieri del Tirreno at Riva Trigoso (Liguria), it was named after the Genoese Renaissance admiral Andrea Doria.

History
Laid down in 1958, the ship was launched in 1962, and commissioned in 1964.

Initially based at La Spezia, the ship participated in numerous military training exercise in the Mediterranean, and in humanitarian campaigns in Far East and in the Tyrrhenian Sea, such as the search for   victims of the Ustica Massacre and recovery of homeless people in the port of Naples after the 1980 Irpinia earthquake.

Later it was moved to Taranto as flagship of the 2nd Naval Division. It was decommissioned in 1992 after further operations, including support to the Italian mission in the Lebanon War and during the American Bombing of Libya (1986).

References

External links
 Page at Gruppo di Cultura Navale website 
 Andrea Doria Marina Militare website
 

Andrea Doria-class cruisers
Cold War cruisers of Italy
Ships built in Italy
Ships built by Cantieri Navali del Tirreno e Riuniti
1963 ships
Seaplane carriers of the Marina Militare